John Hislop (7 December 1821 – 19 May 1904) was a New Zealand teacher, school inspector, educationalist and public servant. He was born in Lasswade, Midlothian, Scotland on 7 December 1821. His son, Thomas William Hislop, became Minister of Education.

References

External links

1821 births
1904 deaths
New Zealand educators
People from Midlothian
Scottish emigrants to New Zealand
Dunedin City Councillors